Staton House is an unincorporated community in Pitt County, North Carolina, United States, north of Greenville. It lies at an elevation of 30 feet (9 m).

References

Unincorporated communities in Pitt County, North Carolina
Unincorporated communities in North Carolina